Taiwan Sugar Museum may refer to:

 Taiwan Sugar Museum (Kaohsiung), Kaohsiung, Taiwan
 Taiwan Sugar Museum (Tainan), Tainan, Taiwan